Kettil Runske was, according to Olaus Magnus' Historia de Gentibus Septentrionalibus (1555), the man who brought runes to humankind, by stealing three rune staffs from Odin from which he learnt the runes. An apprentice named Gilbert defied Kettil, who punished him by throwing a rune staff at him whereby he was imprisoned. Gilbert was for a long time imprisoned in a cave on Visingsö in Lake Vättern.

Sources
Olaus Magnus. 1555. Historia de Gentibus Septentrionalibus
Ebbe Schön. 2004. Asa-Tors hammare. Fält & Hässler, Värnamo, .

Runske